The Sámi Archives is a public archives storing material related to the 
Sami people. It is located in the Sami academic park Diehtosiida in Kautokeino, Norway. It was established in 1988, originally as a foundation, and from 2005 part of the National Archival Services of Norway.

External links
 Official website

The Sámi Archives
The Sámi Archives
Indigenous organisations in Norway
Kautokeino
Organisations based in Finnmark
National Archival Services of Norway
1988 establishments in Norway
Organizations established in 1988